The 1902 Nebraska gubernatorial election was held on November 4, 1902.

Incumbent Republican Governor Ezra P. Savage did not stand for re-election.

Republican nominee John H. Mickey defeated Democratic and Populist fusion nominee William Henry Thompson with 49.69% of the vote.

General election

Candidates
Major party candidates
William Henry Thompson, Democratic and People's Independent fusion candidate, former Mayor of Grand Island, Nebraska, Fusion candidate for U. S. Senate in 1901
John H. Mickey, Republican, former member of the Nebraska House of Representatives

Other candidates
Samuel T. Davies, Prohibition, Prohibition candidate for Nebraska's 1st congressional district in 1900
George E. Bigelow, Socialist, Prohibition candidate for Governor in 1888

Results

Notes

References

1902
Nebraska
Gubernatorial